Blair McDougall is a Scottish political adviser in the British Labour Party. He is best known as head strategist to the Better Together campaign during the 2014 Scottish independence referendum.

Career
He was educated at the University of Glasgow, where as chair of the Labour Club he was Ross Kemp's campaign manager during the 1999 Rectorial election.

He went on to serve as chair of Scottish Labour Students from 2001 to 2003 before becoming a special adviser to Ian McCartney, Minister for Trade, Foreign and Commonwealth Office and James Purnell, Secretary of State for Culture, Media & Sport in the governments of Tony Blair and Gordon Brown.

In 2006 he took the post of Youth Representative on Labour's National Executive Committee.

Following Labour's defeat in the 2010 general election, McDougall coordinated David Miliband's unsuccessful campaign for the party leadership. He became Campaign Director of Better Together in 2012. After the No vote in the referendum on 18 September 2014, McDougall explained a key element of success had been regular and rigorous voter research and message testing.

In 2014, he was appointed to an advisory role in Jim Murphy's successful campaign for the Scottish Labour leadership. Murphy subsequently lost his seat to the SNP in the 2015 general election.

In April 2017, McDougall was confirmed as the Scottish Labour candidate for Murphy's former constituency of East Renfrewshire in the 2017 general election. He came third in that election, with 26.7% of the vote, a fall in the Labour vote of over 7 points as compared with the 2015 election, in which Murphy came second with 34% of the vote.

In January 2020, Labour MP Jess Phillips hired McDougall as Scotland adviser for her unsuccessful leadership campaign.

Personal life
McDougall has two children.

References

Year of birth missing (living people)
Living people
Political activists
Alumni of the University of Glasgow
Place of birth missing (living people)
Scottish Labour politicians
Scottish special advisers
Scottish Labour parliamentary candidates